Damiano Lugon (born 1956) was an Italian luger who competed from the late 1970s to the late 1980s. A natural track luger, he won one gold medal and three silver medals at the FIL World Luge Natural Track Championships (Doubles: 1979, Singles: 1979, 1980, and 1986).

Lugon also earned six medals in the FIL European Luge Natural Track Championships with two gold (Singles: 1979, 1989), three silvers (Singles: 1981, 1985; Doubles: 1979), and one bronze (Singles: 1977).

References
Natural track European Championships results 1970-2006.
Natural track World Championships results: 1979-2007

Italian male lugers
Living people
1956 births